Jonathan Barnes (born 1942) is an English scholar of ancient philosophy.

Jonathan Barnes may also refer to:

Jonathan Barnes (author), British writer
Jonathan Barnes House, historic house in Hillsborough, New Hampshire

See also
John Barnes (disambiguation)